Badenoch and Strathspey is a former district of Highland region, Scotland.

The district was created under the Local Government (Scotland) Act 1973 as one of the eight districts of the Highland region. The same legislation abolished counties and burghs as local government areas, and the Badenoch and Strathspey district was formed by combining the areas of (in the county of Inverness) the burgh of Kingussie and the district of Badenoch with (in the county of Moray) the burgh of Grantown-on-Spey and the district of Cromdale. The traditional area of Strathspey was thus divided between the Highland region and the Grampian region.

In 1996, under the Local Government etc (Scotland) Act 1994, the Highland Region became the Highland Council Area and the districts were abolished. The Highland Council (in law a new and different entity), as the successor authority, then adopted the areas of the former districts as management areas and created area committees to represent them. The Badenoch and Strathspey management and committee areas consisted of five out of the 72 Highland Council wards. Each ward elected one councillor by the first past the post system of election. In 1999, however, ward boundaries were redrawn but management area boundaries were not. As a result, area committees were named for, and made decisions for, areas which they did not exactly represent. The new Badenoch and Strathspey committee area consisted of five out of the 80 new Highland Council wards.

New wards were created for elections in May 2007, under the Local Governance (Scotland) Act 2004.  As the wards became effective for representational purposes, the Highland Council's management and committee structures were re-organised. The Badenoch and Strathspey management area and the Badenoch and Strathspey area committee were therefore abolished. The new wards are much larger, each electing three or four councillors by the single transferable vote system; Badenoch and Strathspey is now a single ward, electing four of the council's 80 members, and a ward management area within the council's new Inverness, Nairn and Badenoch and Strathspey corporate management area. The new corporate area is one of three covering the council area. It consists of nine of the 22 wards of the council area, and the nine wards elect 34 of the council's members.

See also
Badenoch
Strathspey, Scotland
Politics of the Highland council area
Highland Council wards 1995 to 1999
Highland Council wards 1999 to 2007
Highland Council wards created in 2007
Regions and districts of Scotland, 1975 to 1996
 Council areas of Scotland, 1996 to present (2007)
Aviemore
Kingussie
Newtonmore
Carrbridge

References

 
Politics of Highland (council area)
Highland council wards